Qazi Mahabub Ahmed is a Bangladesh Nationalist Party politician and the former Member of Parliament of Faridpur-12 and Madaripur-2.

Career
Ahmed was elected to parliament from Faridpur-12 as a Bangladesh Nationalist Party candidate in 1979. He was elected to parliament from Madaripur-2 as a Bangladesh Nationalist Party candidate in 1996.

References

Bangladesh Nationalist Party politicians
Living people
6th Jatiya Sangsad members
Year of birth missing (living people)
2nd Jatiya Sangsad members